Jorgeh-ye Seyyed Ali (also Romanized as Jorgeh-ye Seyyed ‘Alī and Jargeh-ye Seyyed ‘Alī; also known as Jargeh and Jorgeh) is a village in Howmeh-ye Sharqi Rural District, in the Central District of Dasht-e Azadegan County, Khuzestan Province, Iran. At the 2006 census, its population was 459, in 99 families.

References 

Populated places in Dasht-e Azadegan County